The Dell Technologies Championship was a professional golf tournament on the PGA Tour in Norton, Massachusetts, United States, held annually in late summer over the Labor Day weekend. The 2018 edition was the last time the event was staged as the FedEx Cup was reduced from four to three Playoff events in 2019. 

In July 2018, the PGA Tour announced that The Northern Trust; the first event of the FedEx Cup playoffs, would rotate between the New York/New Jersey and Boston areas in 2019 and 2020. The 2019 playing of The Northern Trust was held August 6–11, 2019 at Liberty National Golf Club in Jersey City, New Jersey, and in 2020, The Northern Trust saw the PGA Tour's return to New England and TPC Boston.

History
Replacing the Air Canada Championship in British Columbia on the tour schedule, the tournament made its debut in 2003 as the Deutsche Bank Championship. It is held at the Tournament Players Club of Boston in Norton, Massachusetts, south-southwest of Boston. Unlike most PGA Tour events which are played Thursday through Sunday, this tournament is played Friday through Monday, with the final round on Labor Day.

It became part of the first-year FedEx Cup playoffs in 2007, with its purse increased to $7 million. The purse in 2018 was $9.0 million, with a winner's share of $1.62 million. As the second of the four playoff events, its field was limited to the top 100 players on the FedEx Cup points list. Points were amassed during the PGA Tour's regular season and the first playoff event, The Northern Trust, which takes place the previous week in the New York City area.

Dell Technologies took over as the title sponsor of the tournament in 2017; new subsidiary Dell EMC is headquartered in Massachusetts. Deutsche Bank sponsored the first 14 editions, through 2016.

The event was last managed by the PGA Tour; it was managed by the Tiger Woods Foundation from 2013 to 2016.

Television
With the tournament's offset scheduling, Friday to Monday, network coverage has been over the final two scheduled rounds, Sunday and Monday; cable channels carry the Friday and Saturday rounds. The first network partner was ABC Sports from 2003 to 2006, though the 2006 event was covered under the "ESPN on ABC" banner. The event has been covered by NBC Sports from 2007 to 2018, though the 2011 and 2012 events were covered under the "Golf Channel on NBC" banner.

Winners

Note: Green highlight indicates scoring records.

Multiple winners
Vijay Singh: 2004, 2008
Rory McIlroy: 2012, 2016

See also
 New England Classic – a PGA Tour event held in Massachusetts from 1969 through 1998.

References

External links

Coverage on the PGA Tour's official site
FedEx Cup site
TPC Boston

2003 establishments in Massachusetts
2018 disestablishments in Massachusetts
Former PGA Tour events
FedEx Cup
Golf in Massachusetts
History of Bristol County, Massachusetts
Norton, Massachusetts
Recurring sporting events established in 2003
Recurring sporting events disestablished in 2018
Sports competitions in Massachusetts
Sports in Bristol County, Massachusetts
Tourist attractions in Bristol County, Massachusetts